Georgia May Foote (born 11 February 1991) is an English actress and model. She is best known for playing  Alison Simmons in the BBC school drama series Grange Hill from 2005 to 2008 and Katy Armstrong in the ITV soap opera Coronation Street from 2010 to 2015. In 2015 she was runner-up on the BBC celebrity talent show Strictly Come Dancing. She came 98th in FHM's Sexiest Women of 2015.

Early life
Foote attended Elton High School in Bury and then Bury College. She has an older sister named Katie.

Career
Foote has been appearing on British television since 2004. She has played two different murder victims: Angela Fairley in the psychological thriller Conviction, and as Charley Witham in Life on Mars. Other roles are Rosie in Sorted, Katy Barnes in Doctors, Jennifer Thurber in the BBC drama Casualty (20 September 2008), Julie Tinniswood in the ITV drama Heartbeat (3 May 2009), Bryony in Emmerdale (April 2010), and Gemma in This Is England 86. She played the role of Lauren in the short film Cotton Stones. She also appeared in two domestic abuse television adverts. She made a guest appearance in Coronation Street as Jess Burrows (18 January 2010), but was re-introduced as a new, regular character in July 2010, playing Katy Armstrong. She left the show in 2015 to pursue other acting roles, interests, projects, and her modelling career.

In 2013, Foote was nominated for the Sexiest Female Award at the British Soap Awards, but lost out to fellow Coronation Street actress Michelle Keegan. In 2014, she was nominated for the same award but again lost out to Michelle Keegan who portrayed Tina McIntyre in the show. In 2015 she came 98th on FHM's 100 Sexiest Women, she featured alongside Keegan who came 1st, the first time two stars from the same British soap had been in the Top 100 public poll.

Foote was signed to a modelling contract with Select Model Management in October 2014.

Foote has appeared as a guest and contestant on shows such as Fake Reaction, All Star Family Fortunes, BBC Breakfast, Celebrity Juice and Loose Women.

Strictly Come Dancing

On 13 August 2015, it was announced that Foote would be participating in the thirteenth series of the BBC celebrity talent show Strictly Come Dancing from September 2015. She was partnered with professional dancer Giovanni Pernice. The couple eventually reached the final where they received the maximum 40 points for their Charleston. They ended as joint runners-up along with Kellie Bright and Kevin Clifton, losing out to Jay McGuiness and Aliona Vilani who won the competition.

Filmography

Awards and nominations

References

External links
 

Living people
1991 births
20th-century English actresses
21st-century English actresses
Actresses from Greater Manchester
English actresses
English child actresses
English female models
English film actresses
English radio actresses
English soap opera actresses
English television actresses
English television personalities
People from Bury, Greater Manchester
People with vitiligo
Select Model Management models